Martín Rico Jiménez (born 1 July 1959) is a Mexican politician from the National Action Party. From 2009 to 2012 he served as Deputy of the LXI Legislature of the Mexican Congress representing Guanajuato.

References

1959 births
Living people
Politicians from Guanajuato
People from Celaya
National Action Party (Mexico) politicians
21st-century Mexican politicians
Universidad de Guanajuato alumni
Deputies of the LXI Legislature of Mexico
Members of the Chamber of Deputies (Mexico) for Guanajuato